A G-seat is an exact replica of an ejection seat in a jet fighter, but equipped with additional systems that provide haptic feedback to the pilot in the seat. This seat is not used on actual aircraft, but rather in flight simulators, especially those without a motion platform, like simulators of jet fighters and helicopters.

Flight training